The 1967–68 Pittsburgh Pipers season was the 1st season of the ABA. The Pipers finished first in the Eastern Division and won their first and only ABA title.

In the Eastern Division semifinals, the Pipers swept the Indiana Pacers in three games. In the Eastern Division Finals, the Pipers eliminated the Minnesota Muskies, in five games. The Western Division champion New Orleans Buccaneers appeared in the ABA Championships for the first time and were defeated by the Pipers in seven games. The Pipers would soon move to Minnesota for the next season, only to return a year later. Plaguing injuries nagged the team for the rest of their brief tenure in Pittsburgh, as they would disband in 1972, only four years after winning the title. The Pipers hold a legacy as the first ABA champion along with Pittsburgh's only professional basketball champion.

Roster
13 Craig Dill (Center, University of Michigan)
20 Cal Graham (Guard, Gannon University)
30 Ira Harge (Center, University of New Mexico)
42 Connie Hawkins (Power forward, University of Iowa)
12 Art Heyman (Small forward, Duke University)
12 Bob Hogsett (Forward, University of Tennessee)
20 Jim Jarvis (Point guard, Oregon State University)
14 Arvesta Kelly (Guard, Lincoln University of Missouri)
40 Tom Kerwin (Forward, Centenary College of Louisiana)
25 Barry Liebowitz (Shooting guard, Long Island University)
22 Bill Meyer (Guard, Hiram College)
50 Rich Parks (Small forward, Saint Louis University)
30 Willie Porter (Power forward, Tennessee State University)
-- John Postley (Forward, Bethune-Cookman College)
45 Herschell Turner (Point guard, University of Nebraska)
22 Steve Vacendak (Point guard, Duke University)
10 Chico Vaughn (Shooting guard, Southern Illinois University)
32 Trooper Washington (Point guard, Cheyney University of Pennsylvania)
14 Dexter Westbrook (Forward, Providence College)
44 Charlie Williams (Point guard, Seattle University)
24 Leroy Wright (Power forward, University of the Pacific)

Bold indicates player was on final roster when team won championship.

Season standings

Record vs. opponents

Playoffs
Eastern Division Semifinals

Pipers win series, 3–0

Division Finals

Pipers win series, 4–1

ABA Finals

Pipers win series, 4–3

In six out of the 15 playoff games he played, Hawkins was the lead scorer. As such, he was named Playoffs MVP. Hawkins would be elected to the Naismith Memorial Basketball Hall of Fame in 1992. As it turned out, this would be his only championship.

Awards, records, and honors
1968 ABA All-Star Game
Connie Hawkins
Chico Vaughn
Most Valuable Player
Connie Hawkins

References

Pittsburgh
Pittsburgh Condors seasons
American Basketball Association championship seasons
Pittsburg
Pittsburg